J. R. R. Tolkien's Middle-earth fantasy writings have often been accused of embodying outmoded attitudes to race. However, scholars have noted that he was influenced by Victorian attitudes to race and to a literary tradition of monsters, and that he was anti-racist both in peacetime and during the two World Wars.

With the late 19th century background of eugenics and a fear of moral decline, some critics believed that the mention of race mixing in The Lord of the Rings embodied scientific racism. Other commentators thought that Tolkien's description of the orcs was modelled on racist wartime propaganda caricatures of the Japanese. Critics have noted, too, that the work embodies a moral geography, with good in the West, evil in the East.

Against this, Tolkien strongly opposed Nazi racial theories, as seen in a 1938 letter he wrote to his publisher, while in the Second World War he vigorously opposed anti-German propaganda. His Middle-earth has been described as definitely polycultural and polylingual, while scholars have noted that attacks on Tolkien based on The Lord of the Rings often omit relevant evidence from the text.

Discussions of racism in Middle-earth 

Some critics have found what they consider to be outmoded views on race in Tolkien's Middle-earth stories, generally based on their views of how his imagery depicts the relationship between evil and race (the main races being Elf, Dwarf, Hobbit, Man, and Orc). Robert Stuart begins his analysis by stating that Tolkien was a "racialist" since he writes of races with different attributes, before asking "Was Tolkien racist?" and analysing in turn Tolkien's use of black and white (including his antipathy to racism and apartheid from his mother's experience in South Africa), the nature of Orcs, the racial connections in his language, antisemitism, and the apparent hierarchy of races and lords within them. Stuart concludes that "Tolkien’s legendarium is suffused with racialist imagery and, at times, imbued with racist values."

Fear of moral decline through racial mixing 

The scholars of English literature William N. Rogers II and Michael R. Underwood, note that a widespread element of late 19th century Western culture was fear of moral decline and degeneration; this led to eugenics. In The Two Towers, the Ent Treebeard says:

Robin D. Reid, writing in the Journal of Tolkien Research, says that modern studies of the many influences on Tolkien's orcs include a focus on the scientific racism of the 19th century and the 20th-century challenges to that concept. Similarly, Australian scholar Helen Young, who studies the links between white supremacism and medievalism, describes Tolkien as a bridge between the scientific racism of the 19th century and racism in modern fantasy.

Polycultural Middle-earth 

The Germanic studies scholar Sandra Ballif Straubhaar states that "a polycultured, polylingual world is absolutely central" to Middle-earth and that readers and filmgoers will quickly see that.

The historian and Tolkien scholar Jared Lobdell likewise disagreed with any notions of the racism inherent or latent in Tolkien's works and wondered "if there were a way of writing epic fantasy about a battle against an evil spirit and his monstrous servants without its being subject to speculation of racist intent".

Straubhaar calls the "recurring accusations in the popular media" of racism in Tolkien's construction of Middle-earth "interesting". Straubhaar quotes the Swedish cultural studies scholar David Tjeder who described Gollum's account of the men of Harad ("Not nice; very cruel wicked Men they look. Almost as bad as Orcs, and much bigger.") in Aftonbladet as "stereotypical and reflective of colonial attitudes". She says that Gollum's view instead, with its "arbitrary and stereotypical assumptions about the 'Other'", is absurd and that Gollum cannot be taken as an authority on Tolkien's opinion. Straubhaar contrasts this with Sam Gamgee's more humane response to the sight of a dead Harad warrior, which she finds "harder to find fault with":

Fimi observes in the same scene that Tolkien is here "far from demonising the enemy or dehumanising the 'other'."

Straubhaar quotes the English scholar Stephen Shapiro, who wrote in The Scotsman that

Straubhaar concedes that Shapiro may have had a point with "slant-eyed" but comments that this was milder than that of many of his contemporary novelists such as John Buchan, and notes that Tolkien had made "appalled objection" when people had misapplied his story to current events. She similarly observes that Tjeder had failed to notice Tolkien's "concerted effort" to change the Western European "paradigm" that speakers of supposedly superior languages were "ethnically superior".

Patrick Curry, Christine Chism and others say that race-focused critiques often omit relevant textual evidence, cite imagery from adaptations rather than the work itself, ignore the absence of evidence of racist attitudes or events in the author's personal life, and claim that the perception of racism is itself a marginal view.

Tolkien stated that he thought of his Dwarves as reminiscent of "the Jews", and that the Dwarves' words were "constructed to be Semitic". This raises the question, examined by Rebecca Brackmann in Mythlore, of whether there was an element of antisemitism, however deeply buried, in Tolkien's account of the Dwarves, inherited from English attitudes of his time. Brackman notes that Tolkien attempted to work through the issue in his Middle-earth writings.

Orcs and evil 

Anderson Rearick III agrees that in Middle-earth, darkness and black are linked with evil Orcs and the Dark Lord Sauron, and that the Orcs are essentially expendable, but lists multiple arguments defending Tolkien from the charge of racism. Rearick cites Steuard Jensen's observation that there are "light skinned characters who did evil things", including Boromir, Denethor, Gollum, Saruman, and Grima Wormtongue. He notes that the link between darkness and evil is made many times in the Bible, with phrases such as "the shadow of death" or "you are all children of light". The irredeemable Orcs, he notes, are traceable to Old English vocabularies where Latin Orcus (Pluto, ruler of the underworld, or death) is glossed as "orc, giant, or the devil of Hell". Rearick ends by stating that racism is a philosophy of power, whereas The Lord of the Rings embodies the Christian renunciation of power; he explains that Frodo gives up everything to fulfil his quest, just as Christ did. In his view, "nothing could be more contrary to the assumptions of racism than a Hobbit as a hero".

Fimi, author of an academic study of Tolkien and race, notes the years of heated popular and scholarly debate on whether Tolkien was racist and concluded that the answer is both yes and no. She writes that Middle-earth is hierarchical like the medieval great chain of being, with God at the top, above (in turn) Elves, Men, and at the bottom monsters such as Orcs. In her view, this makes sense in terms of theology, and indeed in a mythology like The Silmarillion: but a novel like The Lord of the Rings demanded rounded characters rather than symbols of good or evil.

Fimi writes that Tolkien "agonised" over the origins of Orcs. If they were corrupted Elves or Men, that would fit the view that Morgoth could corrupt but not create; but Elves and Men had free will, and if they did evil, could perhaps be redeemed. She writes that the earlier author George MacDonald had created a race of evil goblins, something that she finds an equally uncomfortable "product of 19th-century anxieties about race and evolutionary degeneration". She notes, however, that a novel is written within a tradition; Tolkien's orcs fit into the tradition of MacDonald's goblins and ultimately of the monsters in Beowulf. She concludes, "I believe Tolkien's racial prejudices are implicit in Middle-Earth, but his values – friendship, fellowship, altruism, courage, among many others – are explicit, which makes for a complex, more interesting world", and that complexities of this kind get people of each generation to read The Lord of the Rings, and to interpret it afresh.

Orcs as a demonised enemy 

In a private letter, Tolkien describes orcs as:

The Tolkien scholar Dimitra Fimi describes his mentions of "swarthy complexions" and slanted eyes as "straight out of Victorian anthropology, which links mental qualities and physique". A variety of critics and commentators have noted that orcs are somewhat like caricatures of non-Europeans. Andrew O'Hehir describes orcs as "a subhuman race bred by Morgoth and Sauron (although not created by them) that is morally irredeemable and deserves only death. They are dark-skinned and slant-eyed, and although they possess reason, speech, social organisation and, as Shippey mentions, a sort of moral sensibility, they are inherently evil." He notes Tolkien's description of them, saying it could scarcely be more revealing as a representation of the "Other", but that it is "the product of his background and era, like most of our inescapable prejudices. At the level of conscious intention, he was not a racist or an anti-Semite", and mentions his letters to this effect. In a letter to his son, Christopher, who was serving in the RAF in the Second World War, Tolkien wrote of orcs as appearing on both sides of the conflict:

The literary critic Jenny Turner, writing in the London Review of Books, endorses O'Hehir's comment that orcs are "by design and intention a northern European's paranoid caricature of the races he has dimly heard about".

The journalist Ed Power, in The Daily Telegraph, states that Orcs are "a metaphorical embodiment" of evil, just like the stormtroopers in Star Wars, for which, he writes, nobody accuses George Lucas of racism. He notes that Tolkien was trying to create a mythology for England, which requires characters to be either good or evil.

Moral geography: West versus East 

John Magoun, writing in The J. R. R. Tolkien Encyclopedia, says that Middle-earth has a "fully expressed moral geography". The peoples of Middle-earth vary from the hobbits of The Shire in the Northwest, evil "Easterlings" in the East, and "imperial sophistication and decadence" in the South. Magoun explains that Gondor is both virtuous, being West, and has problems, being South; Mordor in the Southeast is hellish, while Harad in the extreme South "regresses into hot savagery". The medievalist and Tolkien scholar Marjorie Burns too has noted Tolkien's "superiority of North over South, West over East".

Tolkien denied allegations of a North-South bias in a 1967 letter to his interviewers Charlotte and Denis Plimmer:

Tolkien pointed out that this West vs East moral divide developed naturally over the course of the fictional history and denied that it applied to the modern world:

Evidence of anti-racism in Tolkien's letters 

Scholars such as Fimi note that Tolkien was in some ways clearly anti-racist, as he actively opposed "racialist" theories, refused to declare that he had an "Aryan" origin so as to be published in Nazi Germany, spoke out against Nazism, called Hitler a "ruddy little ignoramus", and opposed anti-German propaganda in wartime.

Opposition to peacetime Nazi racial theory 

In 1938, the publishers of the German translation of The Hobbit,  of Potsdam, wrote to Tolkien asking if he was of pure  ("Aryan") descent. He asked his English publisher, Stanley Unwin if he should

He drafted two letters to Rütten & Loening; only one survives, and his biographer Humphrey Carpenter presumes that Unwin sent the other to Rütten & Loening. The surviving draft says

Opposition to wartime anti-German propaganda 

Tolkien expressed an anti-racist position during the Second World War. Tolkien reacted with anger to the excesses of anti-German propaganda during World War II. In a 1944 letter to his son Christopher, he wrote:

Opposition to racism in South Africa 

During the Second World War, Tolkien's son Christopher, training in South Africa, expressed concern about the treatment of black people at the hands of whites, and his father replied:

Legacy 

Discussing race in Middle-earth has continued as filmmakers have sought to depict orcs and other races. The journalist David Ibata writes that the orcs in Peter Jackson's Tolkien films look much like "the worst depictions of the Japanese drawn by American and British illustrators during World War II." The scholar of English literature Robert Tally calls the orcs a  demonised enemy, despite (he writes) Tolkien's objections to the demonisation of the enemy in the two World Wars. The science fiction author N. K. Jemisin wrote, "Orcs are fruit of the poison vine that is human fear of 'the Other'."

The Lord of the Rings: The Rings of Power, a series about events in the Second Age long before the events in the War of the Ring, screened from September 2022, has attracted "fierce debate" about its handling of race. This is through its casting of "people of color" in roles as Dwarves, Hobbits and Elves. The casting has pleased some fans but angered others who feel that the genre is and must remain white. Many of those hostile to the casting have cited Tolkien's statement that "Evil cannot create anything new, it can only spoil and destroy". The cast of the series have spoken out against racism aimed at the actors involved. The fantasy author Neil Gaiman, defending the casting, commented that "Tolkien described the Harfoots as "browner of skin" than the other hobbits. So I think anyone grumbling is either racist or hasn't read their Tolkien." Commentators have observed that the hobbit-like harfoots speak in Irish accents, behave as friendly peasants, and are accompanied by Celtic music; and that they resemble the 19th century caricaturist John Leech's "wildly unflattering" depictions of the Irish in Punch magazine. Gaiman had earlier written in a wider context that "White Supremacists don't own Norse Mythology, even if some of them think they do".

Notes

References

Primary 

This list identifies each item's location in Tolkien's writings.

Secondary

Sources 

  
 
 
 
 
 
 
 
 

Themes of The Lord of the Rings
Middle-earth
Race-related controversies in literature